The Ram River is a river rising in the Alberta Rocky Mountains.  It flows eastward, taking on the North Ram River, before joining the North Saskatchewan River near the Town of Rocky Mountain House.  The name Ram Rivulet appears on a David Thompson map of 1814.  A ram is a male Rocky Mountain Sheep.

The Ram River is characterized by numerous waterfalls and deep canyons throughout its course.  It is first bridged by Alberta Highway 734, and again by a secondary road above its confluence with the North Saskatchewan River.  Ram Falls Provincial Recreation Area is also located on the river.

Tributaries
Hummingbird Creek
Canary Creek, Onion Creek, Onion Lake
Lynx Creek
North Ram River
Farley Lake, Kiska Creek, Joyce River, Lynch Creek, Phillip Creek, Pinto Creek
Fall Creek
Tawdina Creek

See also
List of Alberta rivers

References

Rivers of Alberta
North Saskatchewan River